Gilly Louise Scarlett Flaherty (born 24 August 1991) is an English former footballer who last played for FA WSL club Liverpool. Flaherty is a former Arsenal Ladies player who began her career in Millwall Lionesses' youth teams. She usually plays in the centre back position and represented England at youth level before making her senior debut in October 2015.

Flaherty holds the record for the most appearances in the Women's Super League, playing in her record-breaking 176th game in November 2022 to overtake previous holder Jill Scott. She announced her retirement from football half way through the 2022-23 WSL season.

Early life
Born in Rotherhithe / Bermondsey, Flaherty grew up in the London Borough of Southwark, located directly south of the River Thames. She was educated at Addey and Stanhope School, a secondary school located in New Cross, London,
where she was a Head Girl.

In September 2007, Flaherty joined the Arsenal Ladies Academy, which combines academic studies with football coaching. The Academy is based at Oaklands Colleges Smallford Campus, St Albans, Hertfordshire. She gained a BTEC National Sport and Exercise Science qualification on successfully attaining a pass in the course.

Flaherty took part in a white-collar boxing match in August 2013, to raise money for Millwall FC's Girls' Centre of Excellence. She was stopped halfway through the second round.

Club career

Millwall Lionesses
Flaherty started playing football with her father as a nine-year-old. She joined her first club, Millwall Lionesses, where she played for the youth teams until the age of thirteen.

Arsenal Ladies

Flaherty joined Arsenal following a successful trial with the club in 2003, she was part of its youth programme, playing for the Under-14s team. Flaherty worked her way through the club, coming off the bench to make her senior debut in October 2006 against Birmingham City, in a League Cup match, when only 15 years old.

Flaherty was part of the Arsenal squad that won a quadruple in the 2006–07 season; comprising the UEFA Women's Cup, FA Women's National Premier League, FA Women's Cup and the FA Women's Premier League Cup. She was part of the Arsenal squad that made history by being the first team outside Germany or Scandinavia to win the UEFA Women's Cup. She was also in the team that won the 2006–07 season London County FA Women's Cup.

In April 2011, Flaherty scored the first goal of the FA WSL season – the winner in an away match at Chelsea, in front of 2,510 supporters.

Chelsea Ladies

In January 2014, Chelsea announced the double transfer of Flaherty and Katie Chapman from Arsenal. The move reunited both players with coach Emma Hayes, who previously worked at Arsenal. Hayes said of Flaherty: "Gilly is the best uncapped player in the country. She will become a bedrock for club and country as she has all the hallmarks of a top class player." Flaherty's first season with the team ended in disappointment, as they lost the league title to Liverpool on the final day of the campaign. 2015 proved much more successful, yielding the club's first ever major trophy – won at Wembley Stadium in the 2015 FA Women's Cup Final. In October 2015 Chelsea's 4–0 win over Sunderland secured the FA WSL title and a League and Cup "double".

West Ham United Ladies
In June 2018, Flaherty joined West Ham United Ladies, who had successfully applied to join the WSL for the 2018–19 season. She followed former Chelsea teammates Rebecca Spencer and Claire Rafferty, both of whom had moved to the east London club during the close-season.

Liverpool Women
In July 2022, Flaherty signed for Liverpool Women. On January 12, 2023 Flaherty announced her retirement from football citing family reasons following the passing of her father in late 2022.

International career
Flaherty is a former England Under-19 and Under-20 international. She has previously represented her country at Under-15 and 17 levels and made her debut for the Under-23 team against Germany in September 2010.

Not favoured by England coach Hope Powell, in December 2013 Flaherty was named in the first senior squad to be named by Powell's successor Mark Sampson. She won her first senior cap in October 2015, starting England's 2–1 defeat by China in Yongchuan.

Television appearances
In 2008 and 2009, Flaherty appeared on the Channel 4 television programme Yeardot.

Personal life
Flaherty was a P.E. teacher at John Donne Primary school sporadically throughout her career.

In December 2018, Flaherty revealed that she is a lesbian and living with her partner Lily. In an interview in February 2020, Flaherty disclosed that she attempted suicide when she was 17 years old, due to mental health issues. She is a supporter of the Time to Talk day campaign, run by Time to Change.

Honours
Arsenal
 UEFA Women's Cup: 2007
 FA Women's Cup: 2007, 2008, 2009, 2011, 2013
 FA WSL: 2011, 2012
 FA Women's National Premier League: 2007, 2008, 2009, 2010
 FA Women's Premier League Cup: 2007
 London County FA Women's Cup: 2007, 2008
 FA Women's Community Shield: 2006, 2008
Chelsea
 FA Women's Cup: 2015, 2018
 FA WSL: 2015, 2018
 FA WSL Spring Series: 2017

West Ham United
 FA Women's Cup Runners-up 2019

References

External links

Arsenal Official website bio of Gilly Flaherty
Addey and Stanhope Technology School news on Gilly Flaherty
Skill Schools Academy profile of Gilly Flaherty

1991 births
Living people
English women's footballers
Women's association football defenders
Millwall Lionesses L.F.C. players
Arsenal W.F.C. players
Chelsea F.C. Women players
People educated at Addey and Stanhope School
FA Women's National League players
Women's Super League players
England women's under-23 international footballers
England women's international footballers
West Ham United F.C. Women players
Liverpool F.C. Women players
Footballers from the London Borough of Southwark
Lesbian sportswomen
LGBT association football players
English LGBT sportspeople
People from Rotherhithe
People from Bermondsey